is Rimi Natsukawa's second EP, released on . It consists solely of recordings on lullabies. It is her second EP that solely features cover songs.

Background

The title comes from the song , which featured on Natsukawa's debut album "Tida: Tida Kaji nu Umui." The album was preceded with the single , a standard Japanese version of the Misako Koja song she covered on her 2002 EP "Minamikaze." "Famureuta" featured as the B-side of this single. The version of "Warabigami" appearing on the single is not on the album, however, a re-arranged duet version with Misako Koja appears instead.

Song sources

The songs are lullabies from around Asia. "Warabigami" and "Famureuta" are songs released by Okinawan musicians (Misako Koja, Parsha Club). Two are lullabies from other regions of Japan ("Chūgoku Chihō no Komoriuta," "Shimabara no Komoriuta"). The Chūgoku one is traditional, while the Shimabara one was written by Kohei Miyazaki (宮崎康平) in the 1950s (popularised by enka singer Chiyoko Shimakura).

"Māmāhō" is a cover of "Mama Hao (媽媽好 Mama's the Best)," a song sung by Josephine Siao in the 1960 Chinese film Kuer Liulang Ji (苦兒流浪記, No Body's Child). "Ten no Komoriuta" is a cover of Mongolian singer Oyunaa's debut Japanese single of the same name, released in 1990. "Chājanga" is a cover of Jajangga (자장가 Lullaby), a traditional Korean lullaby.

Track listing

All songs arranged by Seiichi Kyōda.

Japan sales rankings

References 	

Rimi Natsukawa albums
2003 EPs
Victor Entertainment EPs